Pevno (in older sources also Peven) is a small village in the Municipality of Škofja Loka in the Upper Carniola region of Slovenia.

Mass grave
Pevno is the site of a mass grave from the period immediately after the Second World War. It contains the remains of Home Guard prisoners of war that were held at Loka Castle and murdered between 25 and 30 May 1945. It may also contain the remains of a group murdered before the end of the war.

Church

The local church is dedicated to Saint Ursula. It belongs to the parish of Stara Loka.

References

External links

Pevno at Geopedia

Populated places in the Municipality of Škofja Loka